Penicillifera apicalis, the Oriental white silk-moth is a moth of the family Bombycidae first described by Francis Walker in 1862. It is found from the north-eastern parts of the Himalaya to Sundaland and the Philippines.

References

Bombycidae
Moths described in 1862